In phytosociology and community ecology  an association is a type of ecological community with a predictable species composition and consistent physiognomy (structural appearance) which occurs in a particular habitat type. The term was first coined by Alexander von Humboldt and formalised by the International Botanical Congress in 1910.

An association can be viewed as a real, integrated entity shaped either by species interactions or by similar habitat requirements, or it can be viewed as merely a common point along a continuum. The former view was championed by American ecologist Frederic Clements, who viewed the association as a whole that was more than the sum of its parts, and by Josias Braun-Blanquet, a Swiss-born phytosociologist. On the other end of the argument was American ecologist Henry Gleason, who saw these groupings of plant species as a coincidence produced by the "fluctuation and fortuitous immigration of plants, and an equally fluctuating and variable environment".

See also 
 Plant community
 Species aggregate
 Alliance (taxonomy)

References

Further reading

Community ecology
Habitats
Ecology terminology
Habitat